Ca2+ ATPase is a form of P-ATPase that transfers calcium after a muscle has contracted. The two kinds of calcium ATPase are:
Plasma membrane Ca2+ ATPase (PMCA)
Sarcoplasmic reticulum Ca2+ ATPase (SERCA)

Plasma membrane Ca2+ ATPase (PMCA) 

Plasma membrane Ca2+ ATPase (PMCA) is a transport protein in the plasma membrane of cells that serves to remove calcium (Ca2+) from the cell. It is vital for regulating the amount of Ca2+ within cells.
In fact, the PMCA is involved in removing Ca2+ from all eukaryotic cells.
There is a very large transmembrane electrochemical gradient of Ca2+ driving the entry of the ion into cells, yet it is very important for cells to maintain low concentrations of Ca2+ for proper cell signalling; thus it is necessary for the cell to employ ion pumps to remove the Ca2+.
The PMCA and the sodium calcium exchanger (NCX) are together the main regulators of intracellular Ca2+ concentrations.
Since it transports Ca2+ into the extracellular space, the PMCA is also an important regulator of the calcium concentration in the extracellular space.

The PMCA belongs to a family of P-type primary ion transport ATPases that form an aspartyl phosphate intermediate.

The PMCA is expressed in a variety of tissues, including the brain.

Sarcoendoplasmic Reticulum Ca2+ ATPase (SERCA) 

In myocytes (muscle cells) Ca2+ is normally sequestered (isolated) in a specialized form of endoplasmic reticulum (ER) called sarcoplasmic reticulum (SR). It is a Ca2+ ATPase that transfers Ca2+ from the cytosol of the cell to the lumen of the SR at the expense of ATP hydrolysis during muscle relaxation. In the skeletal muscles the calcium pump in the sarcoplasmic reticulum membrane works in harmony with similar calcium pumps in the plasma membrane. This ensures that the cytosolic concentration of free calcium in resting muscle is below 0.1µM. The sarcoplasmic and endoplasmic reticulum calcium pumps are closely related in structure and mechanism, and both are inhibited by the tumor-promoting agent thapsigargin, which does not affect the plasma membrane Ca2+ pumps.

See also 
 Active transport#Counter-transport

References

External links 
 
 
 Overview at utoronto.ca
 Cation transporting ATPase family in Pfam

Transport proteins
Transmembrane proteins
EC 7.2.2